Jebel Jais is a mountain of the North-Western Hajar range in the Musandam Governorate of Oman and also in Ras Al Khaimah, United Arab Emirates.

Infrastructure
On the Omani side, the mountain is largely undeveloped, inaccessible, and far from any development, however on the United Arab Emirates side there has been a lot of development in recent years. A  road has been built, which hairpins most of the way up the mountain on the United Arab Emirates side. Near the top of the road, there are parking places, food providers, toilets and a viewing platform. After a security checkpoint, the road continues up a few kilometers further to the world's longest zip-line and an Etisalat cell tower, as well as a large flat area used for outdoor shows and parking. New buildings are also being built along this road section, for use of the zip-line operating company. This section was completed towards the end of 2017; however it remains closed to the public, by motorized vehicles, as of December 2019. A private brick road then continues further up, to Sheikh Saud Bin Saqr Al Qasimi's palace, which is situated near the UAE's highest point. The summit is then accessible by hiking, a short distance after the palace perimeter fence.

The road was completed by September 2019.

UAE Tour Road Cycling Race
The mountain, and the highway to its peak, feature prominently in the UAE Tour, an annual road cycling stage race, first held in 2019 as part of the UCI World Tour. Due to the difficulty of the long, steep climb, the stage which finishes here is usually considered the queen stage of the entire UAE Tour. Previous winners of the Jebel Jais stage include Grand Tour and UAE Tour winners Primož Roglič and Tadej Pogačar.

Jebel Jais ZipLine
The world's longest zip line opened on the mountain in February 2018.

Climate
The temperature of Ras Al Khaimah tends to be lower than other parts of the country. Temperatures as low as -5 degrees Celsius have been measured at the top of the mountain in winter. The temperatures at the highest elevations on the mountain tend  to be lower than other parts of United Arab Emirates, by about ten degrees, except for spots such as the mountains of Hafeet, Yibir, Yanas and Al-Heben.

Snow fall
In January 2009 there was snow on Jebel Jais. This was only the second time snow had been reported in the history of United Arab Emirates, previously having only been seen in 2004. There was less on this occasion. In February 2017 it snowed again on Jebel Jais and the temperatures fell down-to -5 degrees Celsius. In January 2020 a mix of snow and hail covered the mountain with the temperature dropping below zero degrees.

Gallery

See also
 Geography of Oman
 Geography of the United Arab Emirates
 List of countries by highest point
 List of tourist attractions in the United Arab Emirates
 Wadi Bih
 Wildlife of Oman
 Wildlife of the United Arab Emirates

References

External links
  Is this the right way to the top?, The National, February 21, 2009.
 Jebel Jais, Ras Al Khaimah, UAE | جبل جيس، إمارة رأس الخيمة، الإمارات (YouTube)
 Hiking: The Highest Points in the UAE

Jais
Jais
Highest points of countries
Al Hajar Mountains
Musandam Peninsula